is a Japanese voice actress from Kanagawa Prefecture. She is affiliated with Aoni Production.

Filmography

Television animation
Teekyū 2 (2013), Mika-san
Teekyū 3 (2013), Mika-san, Shrine Maiden, Light music club member B
A Good Librarian Like a Good Shepherd (2014), Child, Female Student B, Teacher A, Waitress 2
Free! Eternal Summer (2014), Coach
Hamatora (2014), Girl, Female College Student
Majimoji Rurumo (2014), Yumi-chan
Sakura Trick (2014), Ayumi Yoshida
Shirobako (2014), Midori Imai
Castle Town Dandelion (2015), Hitomi Ichijō
Charlotte (2015), Sugimoto, Female Student Aida, Female Student Katō, TV Commercial Voice
Rampo Kitan: Game of Laplace (2015), Copycat Criminal, Girl
Teekyū 6 (2015), Mika-san
Valkyrie Drive: Mermaid (2015), Resident, Hekuse, Kosugi
And You Thought There Is Never a Girl Online? (2016), Nanako Akiyama/Sette
Rilu Rilu Fairilu (2016), Carrot
Alice & Zouroku (2017), Sana
Fuuka (2017), Haruka Akitsuki
New Game!! (2017), Tsubame Narume
Onagawa-chū Basuke-bu 5-nin no Natsu (2017), Nanami
Tsugumomo (2017), Nago Eiko
Katana Maidens ~ Toji No Miko (2018), Uchizako Ayumu
Hanebado! (2018), Ayano Hanesaki
Planet With (2018), Miu Inaba
A Certain Magical Index III (2018), Xochitl
Wataten!: An Angel Flew Down to Me (2019), Koyori Tanemura
Girly Air Force (2019), Eagle
The Demon Girl Next Door (2019), Ryōko Yoshida
Tenka Hyakken ~Meiji-kan e Yōkoso!~ (2019), Kogarasumaru
A Certain Scientific Railgun T (2020), Xochitl
Blue Reflection Ray (2021), Miyako Shirakaba
I'm Quitting Heroing (2022), Lili
The Demon Girl Next Door Season 2 (2022), Ryōko Yoshida
Atelier Ryza: Ever Darkness & the Secret Hideout (2023), Klaudia Valentz
Reign of the Seven Spellblades (2023), Katie Aalto

OVA
Locodol: Christmas Special (2015), Satoshi Mikazuki

ONA
Pretty Guardian Sailor Moon Crystal (2015), Droid 2

Anime films
Shirobako: The Movie (2020), Midori Imai
Wataten!: An Angel Flew Down to Me: Precious Friends (2022), Koyori Tanemura

Video games
Deception IV: Blood Ties (2015), Reina
Fate/Grand Order (2017), Abigail Williams
Xenoblade Chronicles 2 (2017), Nia
Alice Gear Aegis (2018), Raiya Kaeruzaka
Girls' Frontline (2018) HK P30 & SSG 3000 
Atelier Ryza: Ever Darkness & the Secret Hideout (2019), Klaudia Valentz
Azur Lane (2019), HMS Swiftsure, Klaudia Valentz
Grimms Notes (2019), Magic Mirror
Touhou: Spell Bubble (2020), Cirno
Atelier Ryza 2: Lost Legends & the Secret Fairy (2020), Klaudia Valentz
Arknights (2020), Mint
A Certain Magical Index: Imaginary Fest (2021), Xochitl
Artery Gear: Fusion (2022), Klaudia Valentz
Xenoblade Chronicles 3 (2022), Queen Nia
Atelier Ryza 3: Alchemist of the End & the Secret Key (2023), Klaudia Valentz

References

External links
 Official agency profile 
 

Living people
Aoni Production voice actors
Japanese video game actresses
Japanese voice actresses
Voice actresses from Kanagawa Prefecture
Year of birth missing (living people)